Yang Huimin (March 6, 1915 – March 9, 1992) was a Girl Guide during the 1937 Battle of Shanghai who supplied a flag and brought supplies to besieged defenders of the Sihang Warehouse. Her actions proved inspiring to the defenders, who flew the flag the next daybreak in front of thousands of watching eyes across the bank of the Suzhou Creek.

Personal life
Yang had studied physical education in Shanghai and was a member of the Girl Scouts when the war broke out. Her courageous action during the Defense of Sihang Warehouse made her famous. In 1938, she was sent overseas to raise support and spoke about China's struggle in a number of countries.

After the Chinese Civil War, Yang followed the Chiang Kai-shek government to Taiwan. She married National Taiwan University Professor of Physical Education, Zhu Chongming (朱重明) and had two sons, Zhu Fugui (朱復圭) and Zhu Fuhong (朱復轟). She worked as a physical education teacher in Taipei. The sons were not aware of their mother's war effort when they studied her role in grade school lessons.

Yang died of a stroke on March 9, 1992 at the age of 78. Her involvement in the Sihang Warehouse defense is featured in the 1976 Taiwanese film Eight Hundred Heroes with Brigitte Lin playing her role. She objected to some of the ways in which the film exaggerated her action for dramatic effect. In 2020, Yang is portrayed by Tang Yixin in the Chinese historical war drama The Eight Hundred, which became the second highest-grossing film of 2020.

See also

References

 Margaret Mih Tillman. "Engendering Children of the Resistance: Models of Gender and Scouting in China, 1919–1937". Cross-Currents: East Asian History and Culture Review, no. 13 (2014): 134–173.
 800 warrior offer flag – Yang Huimin | China Financial

1915 births
1992 deaths
Chinese people of World War II
Educators from Shanghai
Scouting pioneers
Taiwanese people from Shanghai